Mao Izumi (born 1 November 1996) is a Japanese judoka.

She is the gold medallist of the 2019 Judo Grand Slam Ekaterinburg in the -78 kg category.

References

External links
 

1996 births
Living people
Japanese female judoka
21st-century Japanese women